Thiru Vi Ka Park, also known as Shenoy Nagar Park, is an urban park at Chennai, India. The park is located in Shenoy Nagar.

History
The park originally spanned about 8.8 acres with around 300 trees. In 2007, the Chennai Corporation developed the park at a cost of  6.4 million, including installing statues of some leaders, and opened it to the public in 2008. However, in 2011, the park was closed owing to construction work of the Chennai Metro Rail. About 130 trees were axed down to make way for the metro rail construction. With the Metro work getting completed in May 2017, the park is being renovated at a cost of  40 million and is expected to be ready by mid-2019. The park now has only 170 trees, down from 300 trees before the construction of the Metro Rail.

See also

 Parks in Chennai

References

Tourist attractions in Chennai
Parks in Chennai
Urban public parks